Vince Guaraldi Trio is the debut studio album by American jazz pianist Vince Guaraldi (credited to the Vince Guaraldi Trio), released in the US by Fantasy Records in September 1956. It was recorded in San Francisco, California, in April 1956.

Critical reception

The Penguin Guide to Jazz commented on the "mild, unambitious variations on standards" and suggested that Duran was more prominent than Guaraldi. AllMusic reviewer Scott Yanow wrote that the pianist "swings lightly and with subtle creativity".

Billboard wrote a positive review, “Altho [sic] sales are unlikely to be spectacular, this is one of the pleasant surprises of the month. Guaraldi is a young San Francisco pianist who has been getting rave notices with the Woody Herman band. Evidence here says he’s a tasteful, authoritative and facile modernist, and that he swings. Further, he has a sense of humor. Guitarist Eddie Duran and bassist Dean Reilly are worthy colleagues. Try their version of John Lewis' 'Django' for a real delight.”

Guaraldi historian and author Derrick Bang noted that the "absence of drums contributes to the album's quieter sound, and Guaraldi displays none of the Latin-influenced touch that later would consume him, and very little of the energetic chops he delivered while working with the Woody Herman and Cal Tjader bands."

Track listing

Personnel
Adapted from album's original vinyl rear cover sleeve.
Vince Guaraldi Trio
Vince Guaraldi – piano
Eddie Duran – guitar
Dean Reilly – double bass

Additional
 Ralph J. Gleason – liner notes

External links

References 

Vince Guaraldi albums
1956 debut albums
1956 albums
Fantasy Records albums